The 2014 United States House of Representatives elections in Maine was held on Tuesday, November 4, 2014 to elect the two U.S. representatives from the state of Maine, one from each of the state's two congressional districts. The elections will coincide with the elections of other federal and state offices, including Governor of Maine and United States Senate. The primary elections were held on June 10, 2014.

This election marked the first time since 1994 that Maine elected a Republican into the House of Representatives.

Overview
Results of the 2014 United States House of Representatives elections in Maine by district:

District 1

The 1st district includes covers the southern coastal area of the state, including all of Cumberland, Knox, Lincoln, Sagadahoc and York counties and most of Kennebec County. Located within the district are the cities of Portland, Augusta, Brunswick and Saco. The incumbent is Democrat Chellie Pingree, who has represented the district since 2009. She was re-elected with 65% of the vote in 2012 and the district has a PVI of D+9.

Democratic primary

Candidates

Declared
 Chellie Pingree, incumbent U.S. Representative

Results

Republican primary

Candidates

Declared
 Isaac Misiuk, former University of Southern Maine College Republicans president

Declined
 Meredith Strang Burgess, former state representative

Results

Independents

Candidates

Declared
 Richard Murphy, Maine National Guardsman

General election

Endorsements

Polling

Results

District 2

It is the largest district east of the Mississippi River and the 24th-largest overall. It is the second-most rural district in the United States, with 72.11% of its population in rural areas, behind only Kentucky's 5th congressional district. It includes most of the land area north of the Portland and Augusta metropolitan areas, including the cities of Bangor, Lewiston, Auburn and Presque Isle. The incumbent is Democrat Mike Michaud, who has represented the district since 2003. He was re-elected with 58% of the vote in 2012 and the district has a PVI of D+2.

Michaud did not seek re-election, and was selected as Democratic nominee for Governor of Maine in the 2014 election.

Democratic primary

Candidates

Declared
 Emily Cain, state senator
 Troy Dale Jackson, Majority Leader of the Maine Senate

Withdrew
 Alden Smith, navy reservist

Declined
 Joe Baldacci, Bangor City Councilor
 John Baldacci, former governor and former U.S. Representative
 Matthew Dunlap, Secretary of State of Maine
 James Howaniec, attorney, former mayor of Lewiston and candidate for the seat in 1994
 Jeff McCabe, Assistant Majority Leader of the Maine House of Representatives
 Mike Michaud, incumbent U.S. Representative (running for Governor)

Endorsements

Polling

Results

Republican primary

Candidates

Declared
 Bruce Poliquin, former State Treasurer of Maine and candidate for the U.S. Senate in 2012
 Kevin Raye, former President of the Maine Senate and nominee for the seat in 2002 and 2012

Withdrew
 Blaine Richardson, United States Navy veteran, and candidate for the seat in 2012 (unenrolled as a Republican, running as an Independent)
 Richard Rosen, director of the Maine Office of Policy and Management and former state senator
 Alexander Willette, Assistant Minority Leader of the Maine House of Representatives

Declined
 Kenneth Fredette, Minority Leader of the Maine House of Representatives
 Jonathan LaBonte, Mayor of Auburn
 Paul LePage, Governor of Maine (running for re-election)
 Garrett Mason, state senator
 Debra Plowman, former state senator
 Joshua Tardy, former Minority Leader of the Maine House of Representatives
 Michael Thibodeau, Minority Leader of the Maine Senate

Endorsements

Polling

Results

Independents

Candidates

Declared
 Blaine Richardson, United States Navy veteran, and Republican candidate for the seat in 2012 (unenrolled as a Republican, running as an Independent)

General election

Campaign
Bruce Poliquin resisted invitations to debates where Blaine Richardson would be present, including one sponsored by MPBN. Political observers stated this might have been due to Richardson's potential to split the conservative vote. Emily Cain expressed support for Richardson being present at debates and said she will only attend debates where both of the other candidates are present.  A debate to be held on WMTW-TV was cancelled after Cain pulled out to protest Richardson not being invited.  WMTW said they and their parent company, Hearst Television, had strict criteria for invitations to debates that Richardson did not meet.  This criteria included holding large campaign events, fundraising, and performance in polling, all of which WMTW said were not met.

On August 29, Richardson revealed, and Poliquin's campaign confirmed, that Richardson rejected a request from Poliquin to quit the race. A Poliquin spokesman stated the phone call was made because Richardson has "no chance" to win and "seems more interested in working with Emily Cain to bash Bruce rather than have a discussion about the future". Richardson said he would stay in the race and he was "so fed up with the parties, both of them". He also said that Poliquin asking him to quit was one of the biggest boosts for his campaign it has seen.

Endorsements

Polling

Results

See also
 2014 United States House of Representatives elections
 2014 United States elections

References

External links
U.S. House elections in Maine, 2014 at Ballotpedia
Campaign contributions at OpenSecrets
Emily Cain for Congress
Troy Jackson for Congress
Isaac Misiuk for Congress
Richard Murphy for Congress
Chellie Pingree for Congress (not updated since 2012)
Bruce Poliquin for Congress
Kevin Raye for Congress
Blaine Richardson for Congress
Alden Smith for Congress

Maine
2014
United States House of Representatives